Mount Peter is a locality in the Cairns Region, Queensland, Australia.

Geography 
Despite its name, the locality of Mount Peter is predominantly flat farming land (30–40 metres) nestled in the foothills of the Great Dividing Range in the south and western edge of the locality. The principal crop is sugarcane. There is also a quarry in the southern part of the locality.

The Bruce Highway and the North Coast railway line (immediately parallel and north-east of the highway) form the north-east boundary of the locality. A cane tramway delivers harvested sugarcane to the Mulgrave Sugar Mill in neighbouring Gordonvale; the tramway is part of north–south corridor through the Cairns urban area enabling sugarcane grown in the Barron River delta north of Cairns to reach the mill.

Due to continuing population growth in Cairns, Mount Peter has been identified as a priority urban growth corridor for Cairns with a master plan developed for 1582 hectares of land for development as 18,500 homes for approximately 40,000 people.

History 
Mount Peter is situated in the Yidinji traditional Aboriginal country.

The locality of Mount Peter is presumably named from the mountain of the same name in neighbouring Lamb Range, which in turn may have been named after Peter Petersen who established a sugarcane plantation in the area in about 1897. In May 1904, Petersen and his son Henry discovered gold on their property. They managed to mine the gold and keep it secret until 1915. By 1932 there were 40 people mining the gold field. The last mine to close was the Talisman Mine in 1985.

In 1983, the first Sikh temple in Queensland was established in Mount Peter on the Bruce Highway.

Mackillop Catholic College opened in 2016 for students in Prep to Year 3, planning to expand from Prep to Year 12 in a number of years.

References

External links 

Cairns Region
Localities in Queensland